Charles Bernstein (born April 4, 1950) is an American poet, essayist, editor, and literary scholar. Bernstein is the Donald T. Regan Professor, Emeritus, Department of English at the University of Pennsylvania. He is one of the most prominent members of the L=A=N=G=U=A=G=E or Language poets. In 2006 he was elected a Fellow of the American Academy of Arts and Sciences. and in 2019 he was awarded the Bollingen Prize from Yale University, the premiere American prize for lifetime achievement, given on the occasion of the publication of Near/Miss. Bernstein was David Gray Professor of Poetry and Poetics at SUNY-Buffalo from 1990 to 2003, where he co-founded the Poetics Program. A volume of Bernstein's selected poetry from the past thirty years, All the Whiskey in Heaven, was published in 2010 by Farrar, Straus, and Giroux. The Salt Companion to Charles Bernstein was published in 2012 by Salt Publishing.

Early life and work
Bernstein was born in Manhattan to a Jewish family and attended the Bronx High School of Science, graduating in 1968. His mother was Sherry Bernstein (born Shirley Jacqueline Kegel, February 2, 1921, to October 27, 2018) and his father was Herman Bernstein (1901–1977). Charles then matriculated at Harvard College, where he majored in philosophy and studied the work of J.L. Austin and Ludwig Wittgenstein under Stanley Cavell, a seminal figure in ordinary language philosophy, as well as Rogers Albritton. Cavell would oversee Bernstein's thesis, a study that pursued the aesthetic and poetic possibilities of the amalgamation of analytical philosophy and avant-garde literature, focussing on Gertrude Stein and Wittgenstein. After graduating from Harvard in 1972, his first book, Asylums, was published in 1975. Together with Bruce Andrews he edited the magazine L=A=N=G=U=A=G=E, which ran to 13 issues (3 volumes) between 1978 and 1981 (plus 3 supplements and a fourth volume in 1981. This is routinely considered to be the starting point of Language Poetry and was the most significant outlet for both the progressive poetry and progressive poetic theory taking place in New York City and Berkeley. He has said about the creation of L=A=N=G=U=A=G=E, "We tried to trace a history of radical poetics, taking up the model presented in Jerome Rothenberg's Revolution of the Word, and later by Rothenberg and Pierre Joris in Poems for the Millennium and Marjorie Perloff in The Futurist Moment. When you go back 30 years, you see that poetics that now are widely accepted as foundational for contemporary poetry were harshly rejected then." Bernstein and Andrews published selected pieces from these 13 issues in The L=A=N=G=U=A=G=E Book. In 2019 and 2020, the University of New Mexico Press, under editors Matthew Hofer and Michael Golston, published three related books: The Language Letters: Selected 1970s Correspondence of Bruce Andrews, Ron Silliman, and Charles Bernstein; a new edition of Legend by Andrews,  Bernstein, Ray DiPalma, Steve McCaffery, and Ron Silliman; and L=A=N=G=U=A=G=E: Facsimile Edition.

During this period, Bernstein also published three more books of his own poetry, Parsing (1976), Shade (1978) and Poetic Justice (1979), earning a living working for the Cultural Council Foundation's CETA Artist Project and as a freelance medical writer. He also co-founded the Ear Inn reading series with Ted Greenwald in 1978.

Later life and work

From 1989 to 2003, Bernstein was David Gray Professor of Poetry and Letters at the University at Buffalo, where he was a SUNY Distinguished Professor and co-founder and Director of the Poetics Program.  He is also, with Loss Pequeño Glazier, co-founder of The Electronic Poetry Center at Buffalo.  From 2003 to 2019, he was Donald T. Regan Professor of English and Comparative Literature at the University of Pennsylvania, where he co-founded the poetry audio archive PennSound.  He has been the recipient of fellowships from the Guggenheim Foundation, the New York Foundation for the Arts, and the National Endowment for the Arts, and of the Roy Harvey Pearce/Archive for New Poetry Prize of the University of California, San Diego. With his translators, Bernstein won the 2015 Münster Prize for International Poetry for two German translations. In the same year, he won the  Janus Pannonius Grand Prize for Poetry. In 2019, Bernstein was the recipient of the Bollingen Prize for American poetry, for lifetime achievement and for Near/Miss. Bernstein was elected a Fellow of the American Academy of Arts and Sciences in 2006.

Since 1980, he has published a further eighteen books of poetry, as well as editing a number of anthologies of prose and verse, including The Politics of Poetic Form, Close Listening: Poetry and the Performed Word, S/N: NewWorldPoetics, with Eduard Espina, and Best American Experimental Writing, with Tracie Morris. Working with the composers Ben Yarmolinsky, Dean Drummond, and Brian Ferneyhough, he has written the libretti for five operas and has collaborated with a number of visual artists, including his wife, Susan Bee, Richard Tuttle, Amy Sillman, and Mimi Gross. In 1984, he organized"New York Talk" and in 1985–86, "St Marks Talks," the first lecture series at the Poetry Project in New York. In 2001, he co-curated "Poetry Plastique" with Jay Sanders. Bernstein's work has appeared frequently in The Best American Poetry series, Harper's Magazine, Poetry Magazine, boundary 2, and Critical Inquiry. While Bernstein has supported small presses throughout his career, he has also published on such mainstream academic presses as Oxford University Press, Harvard University Press, Northwestern University Press, and, most recently, The University of Chicago Press, which has published his last major works.  The publication of All the Whiskey in Heaven by Farrar, Straus, and Giroux in 2010 was his most commercial endeavor to date. He has said about his work, "It's true that, on the one hand, I mock and destabilize the foundation of a commitment to lyric poetry as an address toward truth or toward sincerity. But, on the other hand, if you're interested in theory as a stable expository mode of knowledge production or critique moving toward truth, again, I should be banned from your republic. (I've already been banned from mine.) My vacillating poetics of poems and essays is a serial practice, a play of voices."

There have been three collections of essays focussed on Bernstein's work: a 1985 issue of The Difficulties, ed. Tom Beckett, The Salt Companion to Charles Bernstein, ed. William Allegrezza (2012),  and Charles Bernstein: The Poetry of Idiomatic Insistences, ed. Paul Bovē, a special issue of boundary 2 (2021). Hundreds of individual essays, chapters, and reviews are listed and often linked at the Electronic Poetry Center.

He appeared in the 2000 movie Finding Forrester as Dr. Simon and in a series of 1999 TV commercials with Jon Lovitz for the Yellow Pages.

Personal life
Charles Bernstein is married to artist Susan Bee. They have had two children, Emma Bee Bernstein  (May 16, 1985 – December 20, 2008) and Felix Bernstein (born May 20, 1992).

Bibliography

Poetry 
Collections
 
 
Shade (College Park, MD: Sun & Moon Press, 1978)
Poetic Justice (Baltimore: Pod Books, 1979)
L E G E N D, with Bruce Andrews, Steve McCaffery, Ron Silliman, Ray DiPalma (New York: L=A=N=G=U=A=G=E/Segue, 1980)
Controlling Interests (New York: Roof Books, 1980)
The Nude Formalism, with Susan Bee (Los Angeles: Sun & Moon Press, 1989; rpt Charlottesville, VA: Outside Voices, 2006)
Islets/Irritations (New York: Jordan Davies, 1983; rpt. New York: Roof Books, 1992)
The Sophist (Los Angeles: Sun & Moon Press, 1987; rpt. Cambridge, UK: Salt Publishing, 2004)
Rough Trades (Los Angeles: Sun & Moon Press, 1991)
Dark City (Los Angeles: Sun & Moon Press, 1994)
Republics of Reality: 1975–1995 (Los Angeles: Sun & Moon Press, 2000)
With Strings (Chicago: University of Chicago Press, 2001)
Shadowtime (libretto for an opera with music by Brian Ferneyhough) (Los Angeles: Green Integer, 2005)
Girly Man (University of Chicago Press, 2006)
All the Whiskey in Heaven (Farrar, and Giroux, 2010)
Recalculating (University of Chicago Press, 2013)
Near/Miss (University of Chicago Press, 2018)
Topsy-Turvy (University of Chicago Press, 2021)

Essays
Pitch of Poetry (Chicago: University of Chicago Press, 2016)
Attack of the Difficult Poems (Chicago: University of Chicago Press, 2011)
My Way: Speeches and Poems (Chicago: University of Chicago Press, 1999)
A Poetics (Cambridge: Harvard University Press, 1992)
Content's Dream: Essays 1975–1984 (Los Angeles: Sun & Moon Press, 1986; rpt Northwestern University Press, 2001)
A Conversation with David Antin (New York: Granary Books, 2002)
"Artifice of Absorption" (Singing Horse Press, 1987)

Editor
Modern and Contemporary Poetics, Editor, with Hank Lazer, of a book series from the University of Alabama Press (1998 —  )
Electronic Poetry Center, Editor, with Loss Pequeno Glazier (1995 — )
PennSound, Director, with Al Filries (2003 — ) and Chris Mustazza
Best American Experimental Poetry 2016, with Tracie Morris and series eds. (Middletown, CT: Wesleyan University Press, 2017)
S/N: NewWorldPoetics, with Eduardo Espina (2010)
American Poetry after 1975 (Duke University Press, 2009) (Special Issue of boundary 2, 36:3) (JSTOR)
Louis Zukofsky: Selected Poems, with introduction (New York: Library of America, 2006)
Sibila (São Paulo), Sybil, under founder Régis Bonvicino (2006- )
Poetry Plastique, ed. with Jay Sanders, exhibition catalog (New York: Granary Books / Marianne Boesky Gallery, 2001)
99 Poets/1999: A Special Issue of boundary 2 (Vol.26, No.1: Duke University Press, 1999)
Close Listening: Poetry and the Performed Word (New York: Oxford University Press, 1998)
LINEbreak: poetry interviews, host/co-producer. Twenty-six 30-minute programs, dist. Public Radio Satellite Program and on the Internet at the EPC (1995–96)
Live at the Ear : A CD anthology of Ear Inn readings (Pittsburg: Elemenope Productions, 1994)
"13 North American Poets", with Susan Howe, in TXT #31 (Le Mans, France and Bussels: 1993)
The Politics of Poetic Form: Poetry and Public Policy (NY: Roof, 1990)
Patterns/Contexts/Time: A Forum: 1989, with Phillip Foss in Tyuonyi (Santa Fe, 1990).
"L=A=N=G=U=A=G=E Lines" in The Line in Postmodern Poetry, ed. Frank/Sayre (Urbana: University of Illinois, 1988)
"43 Poets (1984)" in Boundary 2 (Binghamton, 1987)
The L=A=N=G=U=A=G=E Book, with Bruce Andrews (Carbondale: Southern Illinois University Press, 1984)
"Language Sampler" in Paris Review, No. 86 (New York: 1982)
L=A=N=G=U=A=G=E, with Bruce Andrews (New York: 1978–1981); Vol. 4 co-published as Open Letter 5:1 (Toronto: 1982)

Translation
Red, Green, and Black by Olivier Cadiot (Hartford: Potes & Poets, 1990)
The Maternal Drape by Claude Royet-Journoud (Windsor, VT: Awede Press, 1984) 95)

Critical studies and reviews of Bernstein's work
"Charles Bernstein Issue", ed. Tom Beckett, The Difficulties (1982)

The Salt Companion to Charles Bernstein, ed. William Allegrezza (Salt Publishing, 2012)

Charles Bernstein: The Poetry of Idiomatic Insistences, ed. Paul Bove (Duke University Press/ boundary 2, 2021), Oct. 2021

Bibliography of hundreds of reviews, articles, studies, and dissertations at Electronic Poetry Center.

Notes and references

External links

Charles Bernstein Home Page at EPC
Autobiographical interview with photos (Contemporary Authors / My Way)
DLB entry by Loss Pequeño Glazier
Conversation/podcast with Radio Web MACBA, talking about the performativity of poetry and the multiplicity of voice and elaborating on questions such as the sound of writing, presence and absence, orality, aurality and a/orality.

1950 births
Poets from New York (state)
Fellows of the American Academy of Arts and Sciences
Jewish American poets
Jewish poets
Language poets
Living people
University at Buffalo faculty
American magazine founders
Harvard College alumni
The Bronx High School of Science alumni
21st-century American Jews